Inezia is a genus of birds in the tyrant-flycatcher family Tyrannidae.

Species
It contains the following species:

References

 
Taxa named by George Kruck Cherrie
Taxonomy articles created by Polbot